Spodium, (Latin for ashes or soot) refers to burned bone (usually used for medical purposes), or the act of divination with ash.

Spodium may also refer to other types of ash, such as the scrapings from the inside of a furnace.

Spodium has a long history of medical usage, mentioned by Hippocrates and, for example, in the Medical Poem of Salerno "...Who knows the cause why Spodium stancheth bleeding?..." (in this case spodium referring to oxen bone ashes).

Incineration
History of ancient medicine